Andrea di Firenze may refer to:

Andrea da Firenze (died 1415), Florentine composer
Andrea da Bonaiuto (active 1343–1377), Florentine painter
Andrea di Giusto (active 1425–1450), Florentine painter
Andrea Ciccione (1388–1455), Florentine architect